Isla Corazon is a naturally heart-shaped mangrove island, located on the Chone River estuary off the city of Bahía de Caráquez in Ecuador's coastal province of Manabi.

The uninhabited island is a nesting site to one of the largest frigate bird colonies in the Pacific, along with a host of other bird species.  The island was expanded through the mangrove restoration efforts of the local fishermen and was named a National Wildlife Refuge shortly thereafter.  This group of fishermen started Isla Corazon Tours and now give canoe-led tours of the mangrove ecosystem, departing from Puerto Portovelo, just up the road from San Vicente.

References

External links 
Volunteer Work Isla Corazón
Isla Corazón Travel

Uninhabited islands of Ecuador
Nature reserves in Ecuador
Geography of Manabí Province
Tourist attractions in Manabí Province